Joseph Mansfield may refer to:

 Joseph K. Mansfield (1803–1862), Civil War Union general
 Joseph J. Mansfield (1861–1947), Congress representative from Texas
 Joseph Mansfield (journalist) (1828–1854), American newspaper reporter